
Year 857 (DCCCLVII) was a common year starting on Friday (link will display the full calendar) of the Julian calendar.

Events 
 By place 

 Byzantine Empire 
 Emperor Michael III, under the influence of his uncle Bardas, banishes his mother Theodora to the Gastria Monastery. Bardas, the de facto regent, becomes the most powerful person in the Byzantine Empire.

 Europe 
 November – Erispoe, ruler (duke) of Brittany, is assassinated by his cousin Salomon and followers, in the church at Talensac. King Charles the Bald acknowledges Salomon as the rightful 'king' of Brittany.
 A Danish Viking fleet raids the cities of Dorestad, Paris and Orléans. Others sail up the Oise River, ravaging Beauvais and the abbey of Saint-Germer-de-Fly (approximate date).
 Viking chieftain Rorik, with the agreement of King Lothair II, leaves Dorestad with a fleet and forces his rival Horik II to recognise him as ruler over Denmark (approximate date). 

 By topic 
 Medicine 
 The first recorded major outbreak of ergotism kills thousands of people in the Rhine Valley. They have eaten bread made from rye infected with the ergot fungus parasite Claviceps purpurea (approximate date).

Births 
 Choe Chiwon, Korean philosopher and poet
 Li Cunjin, general of the Tang Dynasty (d. 922)

Deaths 
 March 11 – Eulogius, Spanish priest and martyr
 Dae Ijin, king of Balhae (Korea)
 Erispoe, king (duke) of Brittany
 Harith al-Muhasibi, Muslim teacher (b. 781)
 Hilderic of Farfa, Frankish abbot
 Kim Yang, viceroy of Silla (Korea) (b. 808)
 Yuhanna ibn Masawaiyh, Assyrian physician 
 Matudán mac Muiredaig, king of Ulaid (Ireland)
 Ma Zhi, chancellor of the Tang Dynasty
 Munseong, king of Silla (Korea)
 Roderick, Spanish priest and saint
 Wang Shaoding, Chinese governor (jiedushi)
 Yahya ibn Aktham, Muslim jurist
 Zheng Lang, chancellor of the Tang Dynasty
 Ziryab, Muslim poet and musician (b. 789)

References

Sources